Marthe-Emilie Munsterman (born 19 February 1993) is a Dutch football midfielder, who plays for Women's Eredivisie club Ajax and has twice played for the Netherlands women's national football team.

Playing career

Club

FC Twente
Munsterman joined the youth academy of FC Twente at the formation of the club in 2007 and broke into the first team during the 2010–11 title-winning season. She is an FC Twente supporter and was proud to represent the club in UEFA Women's Champions League matches against Bayern Munich and FC Barcelona.

She played her 100th league match for the club in March 2016.

Everton
After 10 years with FC Twente, Munsterman joined Everton in July 2017, part of a double transfer with teammate Siri Worm.

International

Munsterman won her first cap in the Netherlands' 7–0  win over Estonia on 20 May 2015. She entered play as a 62nd-minute substitute for Maran van Erp.

Personal life

Marthe's father Joop Munsterman was chairman of FC Twente from 2004 until 2015. In May 2011 Joop called Marthe's controversial Twitter remarks about Theo Janssen's transfer to AFC Ajax "unwise".

Honours

Club
FC Twente
 Eredivisie (2): 2010–11, 2015–16
 BeNe League (2): 2012–13, 2013–14
 KNVB Women's Cup (1): 2014–15

Ajax
 KNVB Women's Cup (2): 2018-19, 2021-22,

References

External links
Profile at Onsoranje.nl 
Profile at Uefa.com

1993 births
Living people
Dutch women's footballers
Sportspeople from Hengelo
Netherlands women's international footballers
Eredivisie (women) players
FC Twente (women) players
Everton F.C. (women) players
Women's Super League players
Expatriate women's footballers in England
Dutch expatriate sportspeople in England
Footballers from Overijssel
Women's association football midfielders
AFC Ajax (women) players
Dutch expatriate women's footballers